Sedlice is a municipality and village in Příbram District in the Central Bohemian Region of the Czech Republic. It has about 300 inhabitants.

Administrative parts
The village of Hoděmyšl is an administrative part of Sedlice.

References

Villages in Příbram District